The Dail Soccer Field is the on-campus soccer stadium at North Carolina State University in Raleigh, North Carolina.

The 3,000-seat stadium was built in 2008. The current tenants are the NC State Wolfpack men's & women's soccer teams.  The opening of the stadium allowed both soccer teams to play night games because their prior stadium did not include flood lights.  Prior to the soccer stadium being completed, the complex was used as a training site for athletes from Australia, New Zealand, Jamaica and Norway prior to the 1996 Summer Olympics in Atlanta.

Renovations
During the summer of 2011 the stadium received upgraded seating and bleachers behind both goals. A new brick look also encompasses a majority of the upgrades that have been made to the stadium, while a press box, new fan entrance and a brand-new stand alone building in the southeast corner of the stadium provides a meeting and locker room space and showers.

See also
NC State Wolfpack
NC State Wolfpack men's soccer
NC State Wolfpack women's soccer

References

College soccer venues in the United States
NC State Wolfpack men's soccer
NC State Wolfpack women's soccer
Soccer venues in North Carolina
Sports venues completed in 2008
2008 establishments in North Carolina